Tsur Shezaf (born 1959 in Jerusalem) is an Israeli travel-book writer, journalist and novelist.

Shezaf wrote for Ynet, Haaretz, and Masa Aher (an Israeli geographical magazine) between 1990 and 2008. As a journalist, Shezaf has been on special assignments throughout Asia, Europe, the Middle East and Africa with Masa Aher, Yedioth Ahronoth, Channel 10 and Channel 1 television. Some of his recent work has also been in photojournalism.
He headed an NGO by the name of Yafo Yefat Yamim who worked on rebuilding and recovering the old city of Jaffa - protecting the old harbor and its fishermen from privatizing, reclaiming the sea shore that was destroyed by the government and developing human and physical features of the city.
He is a leading writer and his books, novels and travel, deals with the shrinking Israeli open space, effecting nature and humans.
His latest books are: Daash, A Journey to Deveil's Doorstep 2016, a journalistic travel book based on more than 25 years of traveling in the Middle East including covering the Arab Spring and the wars in Iraq and Syria. In contrast, his latest book is The Devil from the Sataf, a book of Israeli legends collected and invented. Both books became best sellers.
In 2011 he planted a vineyard in the high Negev Plateau, which can be considered the southmost vineyards for top wine vines in the northern hemisphere.

Shezaf ran as a candidate with the Greens Party (Hayerukim) in the 2003 elections for the 16th Knesset, but his party won no seats in parliament.

Works

Legends 
 The Devil from the Sataf Agadot-Masaot (2016)

Novels 
 The wife of the lost Pilot Xargol (2011) 
 The Happy Man Xargol (2007)
 Storm Is a Calm Place For Us Kinutz - Siman Kriaa(2000)
 Love on the Divide Xargol(1998) 
 The Red Buddha Kibutz(1995)
 The Dancer Am Oved(1992)
 Panther TrapKibutz-Siman Kriaa (1988)

Travel Books 

 Daash, A Journey to Deveil's Doorstep Kibutz-Poalim, (2016) 
 End of the road- Death of a Country, a critical travel in Israel Am Oved (2007) 
 Shanti Shanti Balagan, An Israeli travel in India Xargol (2004)
 The Panamericana A journey in Central America Masot (2001)
 Witchcraft in Huncabmba Masaot (1997)
 The Road to Happiness - A Journey in Deserts Keter (1994)
 ' The Silk Road, Crossing Asia from Istanbul to Beijing Masaot  (1992)
 The Sea Book - A Journey Along the Israeli Shoreline Yedioth Aharonot  (1991)

 Travel Guides 
 Sinai & Egypt (1994), Keter Publishing House
 Jordan (1995), Keter Publishing House

 See also 
List of Hebrew language authors

 Films 
 Daash, A Journey to Deveil's Doorstep Ch 1 Israeli TV(2015)
 The Refugees suffering journey '' Ch 1 Israeli TV (2016)

External links 

 Personal web site
 Curriculum vitae
 
 

1959 births
Living people
Israeli non-fiction writers
Israeli novelists
Tel Aviv University alumni
Writers from Jerusalem
Haaretz people
Yedioth Ahronoth people
Israeli journalists
20th-century travel writers